Wenzel Profant (21 July 1913 – 20 January 1989) was a Luxembourgian sculptor. His work was part of the sculpture event in the art competition at the 1936 Summer Olympics.

References

1913 births
1989 deaths
20th-century Luxembourgian sculptors
20th-century male artists
Luxembourgian sculptors
Olympic competitors in art competitions
People from Dudelange